Martina Navratilova (born October 18, 1956) is a Czech–American former professional tennis player. Widely considered among the greatest tennis players of all time, Navratilova won 18 major singles titles, 31 major women's doubles titles, and 10 major mixed doubles titles, for a combined total of 59 major titles, the most in the Open Era. Alongside Chris Evert, her greatest rival, Navratilova dominated women's tennis in the 1970s and 1980s.

Navratilova was ranked as the world No. 1 in singles for a total of 332 weeks (second only to Steffi Graf), and for a record 237 weeks in doubles, making her the only player in history to have held the top spot in both disciplines for over 200 weeks. She won 167 top-level singles titles and 177 doubles titles, both the Open Era records. She won a record six consecutive singles majors across 1983 and 1984 while simultaneously winning the Grand Slam in doubles. Navratilova claims the best professional season winning percentage, 98.8% in 1983 (going 98–1 for the season), and the longest all-surface winning streak of 74 straight match wins. She reached the Wimbledon singles final 12 times, including for nine consecutive years from 1982 through 1990, and won the title a record nine times. Navratilova is one of the three tennis players, along with Margaret Court and Doris Hart, to have accomplished a career Grand Slam in singles, same-sex doubles, and mixed doubles, called the career "Boxed Set". She won her last major title, the mixed doubles crown at the 2006 US Open, shortly before her 50th birthday, and 32 years after her first major title in 1974.

Originally from Czechoslovakia, Navratilova was stripped of her citizenship when, in 1975 at age 18, she asked the United States for political asylum and was granted temporary residence. She became a US citizen in 1981. On January 9, 2008, Navratilova acquired Czech citizenship, thus becoming a dual citizen. She stated she has not renounced her U.S. citizenship nor does she plan to do so, and that reclaiming Czech nationality was not politically motivated. Navratilova has been openly lesbian since 1981, and has been an activist for LGBT issues.

Early life and background
Navratilova was born Martina Šubertová in Prague, Czechoslovakia. Her parents divorced when she was three, and her mother, an accomplished gymnast, tennis player, and ski instructor, moved the family to Řevnice. In 1962, her mother Jana married Miroslav Navrátil, who became her first tennis coach. Martina then took the name of her stepfather (adding the feminine suffix -ová), thus becoming Martina Navrátilová. Her father, Mirek (officially Miroslav Šubert), was a ski instructor.

Navratilova has a younger sister, Jana, and an older paternal half-brother. Her grandmother, Agnes Semanska, was a tennis player for the Czechoslovak Federation before the Second World War and had a ranking as high as No. 2 among Czech women during her amateur career.

When Navratilova was four, she was hitting a tennis ball off a concrete wall and started to play tennis regularly at age seven. In 1972, at the age of 15, Navratilova won the Czechoslovakia national tennis championship. In 1973, aged 16, she made her debut on the United States Lawn Tennis Association professional tour but did not turn professional until 1975. Although perhaps most renowned for her mastery of fast low-bouncing grass, her best early showing at majors was on the red clay at the French Open, where she would go on to reach the final six times. In 1973, she made the quarterfinals, where she lost 6–7, 4–6 to Evonne Goolagong. She made the quarterfinals the next year and lost to Helga Masthoff (née Niessen).

Professional tennis career

Early career

Navratilova won her first professional singles title in Orlando, Florida in 1974 at the age of 17. Upon arriving in the United States, Navratilova lived with former actress Frances Dewey Wormser and her husband Morton Wormser, a tennis enthusiast.

Navratilova was the runner-up at two major singles tournaments in 1975; the Australian Open (won by Goolagong) and the French Open (won by Chris Evert in three sets). After losing to Evert in the semifinals of the US Open in September, the 18-year-old Navratilova went to the offices of the Immigration and Naturalization Service in New York City and informed them that she wished to defect from Communist Czechoslovakia. Within a month, she received a green card and in 1981 became a US citizen. Also, in 1975, Navratilova teamed with world number one Evert to win the French Open women's doubles title, Navratilova's first major title outside of mixed doubles. They teamed again in 1976 to win the Wimbledon women's doubles title over Billie Jean King and Bette Stove.

1978 Wimbledon singles champion
Navratilova won her first major singles title at Wimbledon in 1978, where she defeated Evert in three sets in the final and captured the world No. 1 ranking for the first time on the WTA computer, a position she held until Evert took it back in January 1979. Navratilova successfully defended her Wimbledon title in 1979, again beating Evert in the final, this time in straight sets, and earned the World No. 1 ranking at the end of the year for the first time. Just before Wimbledon in 1979, Navratilova and Evert played possibly the highest scoring women's professional match ever in the Eastbourne final, in which Evert edged Navratilova 7–5, 5–7, 13–11 after facing match points. In April 1981, Evert defeated Navratilova in the finals of the Women's Tennis Association championships, held on clay at Amelia Island, 6–0, 6–0. It was Navratilova's only professional double bagel loss (one she later avenged with a crushing 6–2, 6–0 defeat of Evert in the finals of the same Amelia Island event in 1984). It was at this point that Navratilova began working with Nancy Lieberman to improve her fitness and toughen her mental approach to better compete with Evert and fulfill her true potential. In 1981, Navratilova won her third major singles title by defeating Evert in the final of the Australian Open. Navratilova also defeated Evert to reach the final of the US Open, where she lost a third set tiebreak to Tracy Austin. Navratilova won both Wimbledon and the French Open in 1982.

Dominance
After adopting basketball player Nancy Lieberman's exercise plan and using Yonex isometric midsize graphite-fiberglass composite racquets, Navratilova became the most dominant player in women's tennis. After losing in the fourth round of the first major event of 1983, the French Open, she captured the year's three remaining major titles (the Australian Open was held in December at that time). Navratilova's loss at the French Open was her only singles defeat during that year, during which she established an 86–1 record. Her winning percentage was the best ever for a post-1968 professional tennis player. During 1982, 1983, and 1984, Navratilova lost a total of only six singles matches. This included a run of 13 consecutive victories over her closest rival and world-ranked No. 2, Chris Evert. Navratilova's reign from 1982 to 1986 is the most dominant unbroken spell in the professional era.

Navratilova won the 1984 French Open, thus holding all four major singles titles simultaneously. Her accomplishment was declared a "Grand Slam" by Philippe Chatrier, president of the International Tennis Federation, although some tennis observers countered that it was not a true slam because the titles had not been won in a single calendar year. Navratilova extended her major singles tournament winning streak to a record-equalling six following wins at Wimbledon and the US Open. Navratilova's victory meant she became the first player to win majors on clay, grass and hard court on the same year. She entered the 1984 Australian Open with a chance of winning all four titles in the same year. In the semifinals, Helena Suková ended Navratilova's 74-match winning streak (a record for a professional) 1–6, 6–3, 7–5.

A left-hander, Navratilova completed a calendar grand slam in women's doubles in 1984, partnering right-handed Pam Shriver. This was part of a record 109-match winning streak that the pair achieved between 1983 and 1985. (Navratilova was ranked the world No. 1 doubles player for a period of over three years in the 1980s.) From 1985 through 1987, Navratilova reached the women's singles final at all 11 major tournaments held during those three years, winning six of them. From 1982 through 1990, she reached the Wimbledon final nine consecutive times. She reached the US Open final five consecutive times from 1983 through 1987 and appeared in the French Open final five out of six years from 1982 through 1987.

Rivalry with Chris Evert
In 1985, Navratilova played in what many consider to be perhaps the best woman's match of all time, the French Open final against Chris Evert. Navratilova battled back from 3–6, 2–4 down to 5–5 all in the third set, before Evert hit a winning backhand passing shot on match point to defeat Navratilova 6–3, 6–7(4–7), 7–5. This was a major turnaround for Evert, who was so outmatched the year earlier in the final that Bud Collins remarked as a TV commentator that the sport needed to create a higher league for Navratilova to compete in. In outdoor matches against Evert, Navratilova led 10–5 on grass and 9–7 on hard courts, while Evert was up 11–3 on clay. On indoor courts, however, Navratilova had a decisive 21–14 lead. At the end of what is widely regarded as the greatest rivalry in women's tennis, Navratilova led Evert 43–37 in total matches, 14–8 in Grand Slams, and 10–4 in Grand Slam finals.

Rivalry with Steffi Graf
In 1986 at the U.S. Open, Navratilova prevailed over 16-year-old German Steffi Graf in a semi-final 6–1, 6–7(7–3), 7–6(10–8), before handily winning the final over Helena Suková 6–3, 6–2. Navratilova, with partner Pam Shriver, also won the women's doubles title.  Navratilova also defeated Graf in straight sets at the WTA Tour Championship and with an 89–3 record, earned the number-one ranking for the fifth consecutive year.

Graf dominated the first half of the 1987 season including defeating Navratilova in straight sets in the semi-finals of the Miami Open and in the final of the French Open, 6–4, 4–6, 8–6. However, Navratilova defeated Graf in straight sets in the finals of both Wimbledon and the US Open  (and at the US Open became only the third player in the Open Era, joining tennis legends Margaret Court and Billie Jean King, to win the women's singles, women's doubles, and mixed doubles at the same event—the rare "Triple Crown"). Navratilova reached all four Grand Slam finals in 1987, winning two of them (she lost the Australian Open to Hana Mandlíková). Graf's two losses to Navratilova were her only losses of the year and with 11 tournament wins over the year versus 4 for Navratilova she was able to obtain year-end world No. 1 ranking ahead of Navratilova at No. 2. Graf eventually broke Navratilova's records of 156 consecutive weeks and 331 total weeks as the world No. 1 singles player but fell 60 short of Navratilova's record of 167 singles titles. Including doubles, Navratilova won almost three times as many titles as Graf with a record doubles/mixed/singles combined total of 344 titles to Graf's 118.

In 1988, Graf won all four major singles titles, beating the 31-year-old Navratilova 5–7, 6–2, 6–1 in the Wimbledon final, their only match of the year, recovering from a set and a break down.  Navratilova did not reach the finals of any of the other Grand Slam events but did win nine tournaments enabling her to claim the No. 2 ranking behind Graf.

In 1989, Graf and Navratilova met in the finals of both Wimbledon and the US Open, with Graf winning both encounters 6–1 in the third set. Graf also defeated Navratilova in the finals of the WTA Tour Championships their third and final match of the year. Navratilova, who skipped the French Open that year, did win eight titles and was able to capture the No. 2 ranking behind Graf for the third straight year.  Despite the 13 year age difference between the two players, and Graf's comparative lack of investment in doubles and mixed doubles, Navratilova won 9 of the 18 career singles matches with Graf and 5 of the 9 major singles matches with her. At age 34, Navratilova defeated Graf the last time they played in a major in the semifinals of the 1991 US Open 7–6(7–2), 6–7(6–8), 6–4, to end their Grand Slam rivalry 5–4 up, although it is noteworthy that all 4 of Graf's Grand Slam victories over Navratilova came in the finals of a Slam. This is reflected in the Grand Slams Finals chart below.

Final Grand Slam singles title
Navratilova's final Grand Slam singles triumph was in 1990. In the final at Wimbledon, the 33-year-old Navratilova swept Zina Garrison 6–4, 6–1 to claim an all-time record ninth Wimbledon singles crown. She won four other tournaments that year, although she did not participate in the Australian or French Opens, and finished the year ranked No. 3 in the world, narrowly edged by 16-year-old Monica Seles for the No. 2 spot. 
In September 1992, the 35-year-old Navratilova played 40-year-old  Jimmy Connors in the third Battle of the Sexes tennis match at Caesars Palace in Paradise, Nevada. Connors was allowed only one serve per point, and Navratilova was allowed to hit into half the doubles court. Connors won 7–5, 6–2. She played for the Boston Lobsters in the World TeamTennis pro league through the 2009 season.

Though Wimbledon 1990 was her last major singles title, Navratilova reached two additional major singles finals during the remainder of career: in 1991, she lost in the US Open final to No. 1 Monica Seles; and, in 1994, at age 37, Navratilova reached the Wimbledon final, where she lost in three sets to Conchita Martínez. In November that year, after losing to Gabriela Sabatini in the first round of the WTA Tour Championships, she retired from full-time competition on the singles tour. She was inducted into the International Tennis Hall of Fame in 2000.

Focus on doubles
In 2000, Navratilova returned to the tour to mostly play doubles events, while rarely also playing singles. In her first singles performance in eight years, at Eastbourne in 2002, she beat world No. 22, Tatiana Panova, then lost in the next round to Daniela Hantuchová in three sets. In 2003, she won the mixed doubles titles at both the Australian Open and Wimbledon, partnering Leander Paes. This made her the oldest ever major champion (aged 46 years, 8 months). The Australian Open victory made her the third player in history to complete a "boxed set" of major titles by winning the singles, women's doubles, and mixed doubles at all four majors. The Wimbledon win allowed her to equal Billie Jean King's record of 20 Wimbledon titles (in singles, women's doubles, and mixed doubles combined) and extended her overall number of major titles to 58 (second only to Margaret Court, who won 64). Navratilova made a return to singles at the 2004 French Open after an absence of 10 years, but she was defeated by Gisela Dulko in the first round. Shortly afterwards, and despite being criticized for receiving a wildcard, Navratilova won a singles match over Catalina Castaño 6–0 6–1 at the first round of Wimbledon in 2004, aged 47 years and eight months, to make her the oldest player to win a professional singles match in the open era. Navratilova then lost her second round match with the same player who had beaten her at the French Open the previous month, Gisela Dulko, in three sets.

On Thursday, July 6, 2006, Navratilova played her last matches at Wimbledon, with partner Liezel Huber losing a quarterfinal match in women's doubles to fourth seeds and eventual champions Yan Zi and Zheng Jie, and later in the same day with partner Mark Knowles losing in the third round of mixed doubles to eventual champions Andy Ram and Vera Zvonareva. She had said that her last Wimbledon wasn't about breaking her record shared with Billie Jean King of 20 championships. In an interview, Navratilova was quoted as saying, "People keep saying that, but it so wasn't. I just wanted to win one more title here, period."

Retirement
Navratilova capped her career by winning the mixed doubles title, her 41st major doubles title (31 in women's doubles and 10 in mixed doubles) and 177th overall, at the 2006 US Open with American doubles specialist Bob Bryan. At the time, she was only about a month shy of her 50th birthday and broke her own record as the oldest ever major champion (aged 49 years, 10 months).
Navratilova won 167 top-level singles titles (more than any other player in the open era) and 177 doubles titles. Her last title in women's doubles came on August 21, 2006, at the Tier I Rogers Cup in Montreal, Quebec, where she partnered Nadia Petrova. Navratilova won 18 major singles titles: nine at Wimbledon, four at the US Open, three at the Australian Open, and two at the French Open. Her overall record in 67 major singles events was 306–49 (120–14 at Wimbledon, 89–17 at the US Open, 51–11 at the French Open, and 46–7 at the Australian Open). Some observers argue that the very few singles match she played in her forties should be counted separately in her career statistics. She is the only player to have won at least one tour event for 21 consecutive years and won the singles and doubles at the same event a record 84 times. She was ranked in the world's top 3 in singles for 15 years between 1977 and 1993. Her career singles match win total of 1,442 is the most during the open era.

Playing style and coaches
Navratilova had an attacking serve and volley. Under Renée Richards, she improved her game tactics.

Evert said that "Martina revolutionized the game by her superb athleticism and aggressiveness...She brought athleticism to a whole new level with her training techniques — particularly cross-training, the idea that you could go to the gym or play basketball to get in shape for tennis."

Throughout her long career, Navratilova had many coaches. They included Miroslav Navrátil, George Parma, Věra Suková, Renée Richards (1981–1983), Mike Estep (1983–1986), and Craig Kardon (1988–1994).

Coaching career
In December 2014, it was announced that Navratilova had joined Agnieszka Radwańska's coaching staff. However, in April 2015, after Radwańska struggled in the first half of the season, the pair decided to part ways.

Personal life
In 1985, Navratilova released an autobiography, co-written with The New York Times sports columnist George Vecsey, titled Martina in the U.S. and Being Myself in the rest of the world. She had earlier co-written a tennis instruction book with Mary Carillo in 1982, entitled Tennis My Way. She later wrote three mystery novels with Liz Nickles: The Total Zone (1994), Breaking Point (1996), and Killer Instinct (1997). Navratilova's most recent literary effort was a health and fitness book entitled Shape Your Self, which came out in 2006. An ESPN Documentary was produced about her rivalry with Chris Evert titled, Unmatched. Her rivalry and friendship with Evert is also detailed in the book, The Rivals by Johnette Howard and the children's book, Martina and Chrissie by Phil Bildner.

Sexuality and relationships
In 1981, shortly after becoming a United States citizen, Navratilova gave an interview to New York Daily News sports reporter Steve Goldstein, coming out as bisexual and revealing that she had a sexual relationship with Rita Mae Brown, but asked him not to publish the article until she was ready to come out publicly. However, the New York Daily News published the article on July 30, 1981. Navratilova and Nancy Lieberman, her friend and roommate at the time, gave an interview to Dallas Morning News columnist Skip Bayless, where Navratilova reiterated that she was bisexual and Lieberman identified herself as straight. Navratilova since has reidentified herself as a lesbian.

From 1984 to 1991, Navratilova had a long-term relationship with Judy Nelson, whom she met at a tournament in Fort Worth in 1982 (at the time Nelson was married with two children). Their split in 1991 resulted in a televised palimony lawsuit, which was settled out of court.

On September 6, 2014, Navratilova proposed to her long-time girlfriend Julia Lemigova, a former Miss USSR, at the US Open. They married in New York on December 15, 2014.

Health problems
According to the New York Times Jane E. Brody, in September 1982, an acute attack of toxoplasmosis "contributed to Martina Navratilova's defeat during the United States Open tennis tournament", in which No. 1 seed Navratilova unexpectedly lost to No. 7 seed Pam Shriver in the quarterfinal round. By late October, Navratilova had "apparently recovered".

Navratilova began to wear glasses in 1985 and recalled that her vision had begun to deteriorate in 1984. She continued to wear glasses for tennis for many years. Few tennis players wear sunglasses regularly for tennis and Navratilova is one of them. Although she achieved so much prior to using glasses, her glasses have become iconic. Some sports writers have said that they made her, as with other top athletes who had imperfect health, seem more vulnerable and human.

On April 7, 2010, Navratilova announced that she was being treated for breast cancer. A routine mammogram in January 2010 revealed that she had a ductal carcinoma in situ in her left breast, which she was informed of on February 24, and in March she had the tumour surgically removed; she received radiation therapy in May.

In December 2010, Navratilova was hospitalized after developing high altitude pulmonary edema while attempting a climb of Mount Kilimanjaro in Tanzania.

In January 2023, Navratilova was diagnosed with both throat (stage one) and breast cancer. This came after Navratilova discovered a swelled lymph node on her neck, leading her to take medical tests.

Activism and opinions
Navratilova is involved with various charities that benefit animal rights, underprivileged children, and gay rights.

Navratilova has described herself as a vegetarian. In an April 2006 interview, she said she had begun eating fish again because she found it hard to get enough protein while on the road.

Navratilova is a Democrat, and has donated more than $25,000 to Democratic campaigns.

 Gay rights 
Navratilova participated in a lawsuit against Amendment 2, a successful 1992 ballot proposition in Colorado designed to prevent sexual orientation from being a protected class.

In 1993, Navratilova spoke before the March on Washington for Lesbian, Gay and Bi Equal Rights and Liberation. Navratilova serves as the Health and Fitness Ambassador for AARP in an alliance created to help AARP's millions of members lead active, healthy lives.

In 2000, she was the recipient of National Equality Award from the Human Rights Campaign, the nation's largest gay and lesbian activist/lobbying group.

 Communism and Republicans 
She has spoken out on a number of volatile political issues, including tort/litigation reform, but perhaps her most consistent theme—aside from gay and lesbian rights—has been her unstinting opposition to Communism, and unrelenting opposition to the former Eastern Bloc power structure that compelled her to flee her native Czechoslovakia. She has denounced the Soviet Union's control over Czechoslovakia, maintaining that she refuses to speak Russian to this day because of the Soviet Union's former hegemony over Eastern Europe.

Whenever people go into politics and they try to say that Communism was a good thing, I say, 'Go ahead and live in a Communist country then, if you think it's so great.'

Navratilova was a guest on CNN's Connie Chung Tonight show on July 17, 2002. During the show, Chung quoted a German newspaper which quoted Navratilova as saying:

The most absurd part of my escape from the unjust system is that I have exchanged one system that suppresses free opinion for another. The Republicans in the U.S. manipulate public opinion and sweep controversial issues under the table. It's depressing. Decisions in America are based solely on the question of how much money will come out of it and not on the questions of how much health, morals or environment suffer as a result.

Navratilova said that the remarks referred to what she perceived as a trend of centralization of government power and a loss of personal freedom. In the discussion that followed, Chung stated:

Can I be honest with you? I can tell you that when I read this, I have to tell you that I thought it was un-American, unpatriotic. I wanted to say, go back to Czechoslovakia. You know, if you don't like it here, this a country that gave you so much, gave you the freedom to do what you want.

Navratilova responded,

And I'm giving it back. This is why I speak out. When I see something that I don't like, I'm going to speak out because you can do that here. And again, I feel there are too many things happening that are taking our rights away.

Navratilova was quoted in 2007 as being ashamed of the U.S. under President George W. Bush because unlike the communist regime in Czechoslovakia, Bush was democratically elected.

 Transgender athletes 
Navratilova is critical of allowing transgender women to compete in women's sports. She rejects accusations of transphobia, and says she deplores "a growing tendency among transgender activists to denounce anyone who argues against them and to label them all as 'transphobes.'" Following an article on the subject that Navratilova wrote for The Times in February 2019, Athlete Ally, an LGBTQ athlete advocacy group, removed Navratilova from their advisory board, stating her comments "are transphobic [and] based on a false understanding of science and data".

In March 2019, Navratilova apologized for using the term "cheating" when discussing whether transgender athletes should be allowed to compete in women's sport. She also called for "a debate, a conversation that includes everyone and is based, as I have said, not on feeling or emotion but science."

In an April 2019 article for The Washington Post, she opined that the Equality Act, in its current form, "would make it unlawful to differentiate among girls and women in sports on the basis of sex for any purpose".

In June 2019, the BBC broadcast "The Trans Women Athlete Dispute with Martina Navratilova", where she interviewed people including trans women athletes and sports researchers, presenting evidence on both sides of the debate of whether trans women have any advantage in elite sports. Her closing remarks were "The way I started this journey, I just wanted to see if there are any big surprises, any misconceptions that I had.
And what I think I have come to realise, the biggest thing for me, is just that the level of difficulty that trans people go through cannot be underestimated. The fight for equality and recognition is just huge. That being said, still, for me, the most important thing in sports...and you have to remember, trans rights and elite sports are two different things, although of course they are connected. What's the right way to set rules so that everybody feels like they have a fighting chance? It feels to me that it is impossible to come to any real conclusions or write any meaningful rules until more research is done.

"But for now, I think we need to include as many transgender athletes as possible within elite sports, while keeping it as level a playing field as possible. Look, society has changed so much. Things evolve, things change and maybe I need to evolve, I need to change. The rules certainly need to evolve. If you don't adapt, you've got problems. And so we'll just keep adapting and try to find a happy way forward."

In August 2020, Navratilova along with 300+ women signed a letter to the National Collegiate Athletic Association in support of an Idaho law that bans trans women student athletes from competing in female sports.

In 2021, Navratilova became a leader of the Women's Sports Policy Working Group, formed in response to President Joe Biden's Executive Order 13988 mandate that offered blanket inclusion for all trans women athletes. The goal of the group is protecting girls and women in competitive sports categories, while, wherever possible, crafting accommodations for trans athletes into sport.

Career statistics

Grand Slam singles finals: 32 (18–14)
By winning the 1983 US Open title, Navratilova completed the career Grand Slam, becoming only the seventh woman in history to achieve it.

Performance timelines

Singles

Doubles

Records
 These are Open Era tennis records.
 Records in bold''' indicate peer-less achievements.

Awards
AP Female Athlete of the Year 1983 and 1984
ITF World Champion 1979, 1982, 1983, 1984, 1985, 1986.
WTA Player of the Year 1978, 1979, 1982, 1983, 1984, 1985, 1986.
BBC Sports Personality of the Year Lifetime Achievement Award 2003
Czech Sport Legend Award 2006
BBC's 100 women 2013

Recognition
Navratilova is considered one of the best female tennis players of all time and in 2005, Tennis magazine selected her as the greatest female tennis player for the years 1965 through 2005, directly over Steffi Graf. Billie Jean King, a former World No. 1 player, said in 2006 that Navratilova is "the greatest singles, doubles and mixed doubles player who's ever lived." In 2008, tennis historian and journalist Bud Collins called Navratilova "arguably, the greatest player of all time."

In 2000, she became a member of the Laureus Sports Foundation's Academy.

In 2006, Martina Navratilova was named by Equality Forum as one of their 31 Icons of the LGBT History Month.

Tennis writer Steve Flink, in his book The Greatest Tennis Matches of the Twentieth Century (1999), named her as the second best female player of the 20th century, directly behind Steffi Graf.

In 2009, Navratilova was awarded the International Tennis Federation's (ITF) highest accolade, the Philippe Chatrier Award, for her contributions to tennis both on and off the court.

In June 2011, she was named one of the "30 Legends of Women's Tennis: Past, Present and Future" by Time.

In March 2012, The Tennis Channel named Navratilova as the second greatest female tennis player of all times, behind Steffi Graf, in their list of 100 greatest tennis players of all times.

On August 2, 2013, Navratilova was among the first class of inductees into the National Gay and Lesbian Sports Hall of Fame.

On May 12, 2016, Navratilova was made an honorary fellow of Lucy Cavendish College of the University of Cambridge.

Media
In 1983, Martina Navratilova and Vijay Amritraj appeared in the Hart to Hart episode "Love Game" as themselves, as the guests of honor at a charity tennis event. Her role was the more significant; she partnered with the lead male character Jonathan Hart (Robert Wagner) in a mixed doubles match. Though an homage rather than an appearance, in 1992 Navratilova was mentioned by the titular character in episode 14 of the anime Pretty Soldier Sailor Moon. In 1996, Navratilova was featured with American football player Art Monk in an endorsement for PowerBook in an ad series "What's on Your PowerBook?"
In 2000 Martina appeared as herself on Will & Grace "Lows in the Mid-Eighties" as one of Karen Walker's (Megan Mullally) paramours in a flashback sequence.

In November 2008, Martina Navratilova appeared on the UK's ITV series Series 8 of I'm a Celebrity ... Get Me Out of Here!; she finished runner-up to Joe Swash. In February 2012 Navratilova was announced as a cast member on the 14th season of ABC's Dancing with the Stars. She was partnered with Tony Dovolani, but they were the first pair eliminated. Navratilova guest-starred as a dissatisfied Yelp reviewer in episode three of the third season of absurdist comedy Portlandia.  Navratilova currently has a recurring role portraying Brigitte, a horse trainer who is also the lover of Georgina (Gwyneth Paltrow), the mother of the titular character Payton Hobart Ben Platt, on the Ryan Murphy produced Netflix series, The Politician''.

Pulitzer-Prize winning journalist Glenn Greenwald is developing a feature film documentary film about Navratilova as his childhood hero and as a social justice pioneer, with Reese Witherspoon's production company, Hello Sunshine.

Bibliography
Martina has written a number of books on tennis, as well as a few mysteries.

On Martina or tennis

 with Mary Carillo as photographer.

Jordan Myles Mysteries 

with printings in German, Russian, French and Spanish.

See also

WTA Tour records
Grand Slam (tennis)
List of WTA number 1 ranked singles tennis players
List of WTA number 1 ranked doubles tennis players
List of female tennis players
List of tennis tournaments
List of tennis rivalries
Tennis records of the Open Era – Women's singles
All-time tennis records – women's singles
 Graf–Navratilova rivalry
 Evert–Navratilova rivalry
 List of Eastern Bloc defectors
 Homosexuality in sports in the United States

Notes

 A Career Boxed Set entails winning all 4 Majors in singles, same sex doubles and mixed doubles.
 Doris Hart also holds these records; however, she attained these in the pre-Open Era.
 "Combined" refers to singles, same sex doubles and mixed doubles titles.
 Margaret Court holds 62 titles; however, she attained part of these in the pre-Open Era.
 The Australian Open was held in December, so although Navratilova won 6 straight majors from Wimbledon 1983, she did not technically complete the calendar-year Grand Slam.
 Chris Evert reached 34 consecutive Grand Slam singles semifinals from the 1971 US Open to the 1983 French Open, but this was attained in non-consecutive Grand Slam tournaments. She skipped 14 Grand Slam tournaments during her streak.

References

Further reading

External links

 
 
 
 
 
 
 
 

 

 

 
1956 births
American female tennis players
American people of Czech descent
Australian Open (tennis) champions
Czechoslovak defectors
Czechoslovak emigrants to the United States
Czechoslovak female tennis players
French Open champions
International Tennis Hall of Fame inductees
American LGBT rights activists
American LGBT sportspeople
Czechoslovak LGBT people
Living people
Naturalized citizens of the United States
Olympic tennis players of the United States
Participants in American reality television series
Sportspeople from Sarasota, Florida
Recipients of Medal of Merit (Czech Republic)
Tennis players from Prague
Tennis commentators
Tennis people from Florida
Tennis players at the 2004 Summer Olympics
US Open (tennis) champions
Wimbledon champions
Lesbian sportswomen
LGBT tennis players
Czech anti-communists
Grand Slam (tennis) champions in women's singles
Grand Slam (tennis) champions in women's doubles
Grand Slam (tennis) champions in mixed doubles
LGBT people from Florida
Women autobiographers
American autobiographers
Novelists from Florida
American crime fiction writers
Tennis writers
American lesbian writers
Czech lesbian writers
20th-century American non-fiction writers
20th-century American novelists
20th-century American women writers
American women novelists
Women crime fiction writers
BBC 100 Women
American women non-fiction writers
I'm a Celebrity...Get Me Out of Here! (British TV series) participants
Lesbian memoirists
BBC Sports Personality Lifetime Achievement Award recipients
Defectors to the United States
WTA number 1 ranked singles tennis players
WTA number 1 ranked doubles tennis players
ITF World Champions